Patton Bridge is a small rural hamlet approximately 5 miles from the outskirts of Kendal, Cumbria, England. Its post code region is LA8.

Hamlets in Cumbria
South Lakeland District